Tagus Ranch is an abandoned restaurant, hotel, and 7,000 acre orchard, Founded by Hulett C. Merritt in 1912, and left in the mid 80's. Tagus Ranch was a popular venue, where many country musicians performed. Tagus Ranch is located less than 3 miles north of Tulare, California, off of Highway 99. Tagus Ranch was a German prisoner of war camp during World War II.

References 

 

History of Tulare County, California
Ranches in California
World War II prisoner of war camps in the United States
Internment camps
Prisons in California
Buildings and structures in Tulare County, California
Internment camps for Japanese Americans